Italy competed at the 1998 Winter Olympics in Nagano, Japan.

Medalists

Alpine skiing

Men

Men's combined

Women

Women's combined

Biathlon

Men

Men's 4 × 7.5 km relay

Women

 1 A penalty loop of 150 metres had to be skied per missed target.
 2 One minute added per missed target.

Bobsleigh

Cross-country skiing

Men

 1 Starting delay based on 10 km results. 
 C = Classical style, F = Freestyle

Men's 4 × 10 km relay

Women

 2 Starting delay based on 5 km results. 
 C = Classical style, F = Freestyle

Women's 4 × 5 km relay

Figure skating

Men

Women

Ice Dancing

Freestyle skiing

Men

Women

Ice hockey

Men's tournament

Preliminary round - group A
Top team (shaded) advanced to the first round.

Consolation Round - 11th place match

Team roster
Dino Felicetti
Bruno Zarrillo
Stephan Figliuzzi
Gates Orlando
Mario Chitaroni
Leo Insam
Maurizio Mansi
Bob Nardella
Roland Ramoser
Joe Busillo
Mario Brunetta
Markus Brunner
Robert Oberrauch
Mike Rosati
Lucio Topatigh
Michael De Angelis
Christopher Bartolone
Chad Biafore
Patrick Brugnoli
Martin Pavlu
Lawrence Rucchin
Stefano Margoni
Head coach: Adolf Insam

Luge

Men

(Men's) Doubles

Women

Nordic combined 

Men's individual

Events:
 normal hill ski jumping
 15 km cross-country skiing

Short track speed skating

Men

Women

Ski jumping

Snowboarding

Men's giant slalom

Women's giant slalom

Women's halfpipe

Speed skating

Men

Women

References
Official Olympic Reports
International Olympic Committee results database
 Olympic Winter Games 1998, full results by sports-reference.com

Nations at the 1998 Winter Olympics
1998
Winter